Shafir is a surname. Notable people with the surname include: 

Eldar Shafir, American behavioral scientist
Herzl Shafir (1929–2021), Israeli major general
Iakov Mikhailovich Shafir (1886–1938), Bolshevik historian
Iakov Moiseyevich Shafir (1887–1938), Soviet investigator and journalist
Marina Shafir (born 1988), Moldovan wrestler and mixed martial artist
Michael Shafir (born 1944), Romanian–Israeli political scientist
Relik Shafir (born 1953), Israeli brigadier general 
Shlomo Shafir (1924–2013), Israeli journalist and historian